A list of the Ambassadors of Brazil, or other heads of mission, to the United Kingdom.

References 
Brazilian Head of Mission; Ambassadors and Ministers Plenipotentiary; 1823 - 2015

Ambassadors of Brazil to the United Kingdom
United Kingdom
Brazil